Prelude No. 5 is a guitar piece written by Brazilian composer Heitor Villa-Lobos.

The piece is subtitled "Homenagem à vida social" (Homage to Social Life), is in the key of D major, marked "Poco animato", and is the second of the Five Preludes, written in 1940. The others are in E minor, E major, A minor, and E minor. It was first performed, together with its four companions, by Abel Carlevaro in Montevideo on 11 December 1942.

Written in  meter, this prelude evokes the waltzes danced by the upper classes of Rio de Janeiro in a bygone age.


References

Sources

Further reading
 Appleby, David P. 1988. Heitor Villa-Lobos: A Bio-Bibliography New York: Greenwood Press. .
 Santos, Turíbio. 1985. Heitor Villa-Lobos and the Guitar, translated by Victoria Forde and Graham Wade. Gurtnacloona, Bantry, Co. Cork: Wise Owl Music. 
 Wright, Simon. 1992. Villa-Lobos. Oxford Studies of Composers. Oxford and New York: Oxford University Press.  (cloth);  (pbk).

External links

Compositions by Heitor Villa-Lobos
1940 compositions
Villa
Compositions in D major